The kings of Elam were the rulers of Elam, an ancient civilization in modern-day south-western Iran. The earliest known Elamite dynasty was the Awan dynasty, which came to power in the Early Dynastic period. Elam was conquered by the Akkadian Empire in the 24th century BC and was then ruled by a sequence of Akkadian-appointed governors before independence was restored a little over a century later. After the reign of the powerful Elamite king Puzur-Inshushinak, Elam was conquered again around 2100 BC by the Sumerian Third Dynasty of Ur. Native Elamite rule was after a few decades restored under the Shimashki dynasty during the reign of Ur III king Ibbi-Sin. In  2004 BC the Shimashki king Kindattu sacked Ur, whereafter Elam became fully independent. The Sukkulmah dynasty, perhaps a related lineage, was established in another part of Elam shortly thereafter, and after a period of overlap gradually overtook the Shimashki dynasty.

The Sukkalmah dynasty was followed by the Kidinuid and Igihalkid dynasties, whereafter the Elamite kingdom reached the height of its power under the Shutrukid dynasty. Powerful Shutrukid kings, such as Shutruk-Nahhunte I and Shilhak-Inshushinak, exerted dominion over not only Elam itself but also over Babylonia. The kingdom may have disintegrated following the defeat of Hutelutush-Inshushinak by the Babylonian king Nebuchadnezzar I in the late 12th century BC, but a new line of rulers are attested in Elam from the early 8th century BC onwards. The so-called Neo-Elamite kingdom came under the rule of the Hubanid dynasty in the early 7th century BC, which initiated a short period of intense internal conflict and meddling in Assyrian and Babylonian affairs. The Neo-Elamite kingdom was effectively destroyed by the Assyrian king Ashurbanipal in 646 BC, though Elamite rulers continued to govern the Elamite heartland until the rise and early years of the Achaemenid Empire in the late 6th century BC.

The Elamites created a new kingdom, Elymais, around 147 BC. Initially ruled by the Kamnaskirid dynasty, Elymais often fell under the control of the Parthian Empire as a vassal state, and eventually came under the rule of a cadet branch of the Parthian Arsacid dynasty. Following the fall of the Parthian Empire and the rise of the succeeding Sasanian Empire in the early 3rd century AD, Elymais was conquered and abolished as a distinct kingdom, marking the final end of Elamite political history.

Early Elam (c. 2500–2100 BC )

Awan dynasty (c. 2500 – c. 2100 BC)
The Awan dynasty is the earliest known royal dynasty of Elam. "Awan" was a native Elamite term, referring mainly to modern Khuzestan but also perhaps to the entire Elamite kingdom. Its use as a dynastic name comes from both Old Babylonian sources, which designated the kings of the earliest Elamite dynasty as belonging to the "Awan dynasty", and a native Elamite king list of the Awan and succeeding Shimashki dynasties. The rulers preceding Hishep-ratep and Luh-ishan fall into the Early Dynastic period, though their historicity beyond appearing in the king list cannot be verified. The Awan dynasty was not an entirely contiguous family line and was for a little over a century interrupted by governors appointed by the Akkadian Empire.

Old Elamite period (c. 2050–1500 BC)

Shimashki dynasty (c. 2050 – c. 1850 BC)
After the reign of Puzur-Inshushinak there was renewed Mesopotamian control of Elam under Third Dynasty of Ur, an empire established by the Sumerian king Ur-Nammu in  2112 BC. Though somewhat tenuous, Sumerian rule in Elam was strong enough for the kings of Ur to engage in diplomacy with other Iranian regions. Sumerian imperialism was eventually met with Elamite resistance, most notably in the region of Shimashki, from which a new dynasty (though its precise boundaries are not clear) extended its rule into the lands surrounding Susa. Twelve kings of the Shimashki dynasty are known by name from the same ancient king list also listing the kings of the Awan dynasty. The king Ebarti II, attached to the Shimashki dynasty in the king list tablet between Tan-Ruhuratir I and Idattu II, has in this list been placed in the succeeding Sukkalmah dynasty, which traced its descent from him.

The rulers of the Shimashki dynasty are beyond the king list confirmed by their own inscriptions and by surviving sources from Mesopotamia. Though later portions of the list might record sequential rule, it is likely that the rulers recorded before Kindattu were contemporary rivals or co-rulers, rather than rulers in sequence, since Girnamme, Tazitta I and Ebarti I all appear in the inscriptions of Shu-Sin of Ur (2037–2028 BC). Ebarti I appears to have been the most prominent of the three, though they all belonged to the same family lineage. Ebarti I initiated an age of expansion of the Shimashki realm, which was continued under Kindattu, who sacked Ur and ended the Third Dynasty of Ur. After Kindattu's sack of Ur, Elam became fully independent under the Shimashki rulers.

Sukkalmah dynasty (c. 1980 – c. 1500 BC)
The Sukkalmah dynasty came to power shortly after the fall of the Third Dynasty of Ur, though it overlapped with the Shimashki dynasty for well over a century. The dynastic shift probably reflects a gradual change in power, perhaps the two dynasties began as a single royal family of co-rulers in different geographical regions. The Sukkalmah period was one of the most prosperous in Elamite history, marked by unprecedented prestige and influence. Elam was frequently a powerbroker in Mesopotamian politics, entering into uneasy alliances with various states and rulers. Several new developments also took place within Elam during this time. Notably, rulers did not use the title of king, but rather sukkalmah ("grand regent") and sukkal ("regent") of Elam, Shimashki or Susa. The use of sukkalmah, from which the dynasty received its name, originates from Mesopotamia, where it was used as a title ranking below king. In Elam, its usage as the term for the region's paramount ruler might derive from the title possibly being used by the vassals or governors in Susa during the rule of the Third Dynasty of Ur.

The transition from the Shimashki to the Sukkalmah age is obscure. It seems that the two sequences of rulers were connected; the first Sukkalmah ruler, Ebarti II, is in inscriptions referenced as the father of the succeeding Shilhaha but also appears in a king list recording the Shimashki kings and is identified in some later sources as "king of Anshan and Susa", not as sukkalmah. The political structure of Elam during the Sukkalmah period is not entirely clear; whereas some scholars believe there to have been a single line of rulers reigning in sequence, others believe, due to the different titles and capitals attested, that rulership was exercised as a triumvirate, with the paramount ruler (the sukkalmah at Susa) ruling together with junior rulers (sukkals) of "Elam" and "Shimashki".

The sequence of rulers below follows the most probable sequence of Sukkalmah rulers, per Peyronel (2018), with additional rulers inserted in their chronological placements per Potts (1999). It is impossible to establish the length of any of their reigns, though they can at times be chronologically pinpointed through synchronisms with Mesopotamian rulers. Some internal order can however be imposed in the later portion using cuneiform documents and sealings. These sources have also supported a proposal that Atta-hushu and Sumu-abum of Babylon were co-temporal.

Middle Elamite period (c. 1500–1000 BC)

Kidinuid dynasty (c. 1500–1400 BC) 
Though they are grouped together by historians as a dynasty for convenience, there is no evidence that the five kings assigned to the Kidinuid dynasty were related to each other. The chronological sequence of the five kings is not certain either, but Kidinu was traditionally believed to have been the earliest and the group is thus referred to as "Kidinuid". In terms of historical periodization, this period of Elamite history is conventionally referred to as Middle Elamite I (ME I).

Igihalkid dynasty (c. 1400 – c. 1200 BC)
The second dynasty of the Middle Elamite period is typically referred to as the Igihalkid dynasty, after its founder Igi-halki. In terms of historical periodization, this period of Elamite history is conventionally referred to as Middle Elamite II (ME II).

It is not clear how the Igihalkid dynasty came to an end, but Kidin-Hutran III, who died at some point in the early reign of the Babylonian king Adad-shuma-usur (1216–1187 BC), is generally regarded to have been the last member.

Shutrukid dynasty (c. 1200 – c. 1000 BC)

The third and last dynasty of the Middle Elamite period is typically referred to as the Shutrukid dynasty, after its founder Shutruk-Nahhunte I. In terms of historical periodization, this period of Elamite history is conventionally referred to as Middle Elamite III (ME III). Though the last extensive records of the dynasty are from the time of Hutelutush-Inshushinak in the late 12th century BC, sparse later texts suggest that the Shutrukid dynasty might have stayed in power until the middle or late 11th century BC.

Neo-Elamite period (c. 1000–520/519 BC)

Elamite Dark Ages (c. 1000–760 BC) 
The Neo-Elamite period spans the centuries from the fall of the Shutrukid dynasty to the rise of the Achaemenid Empire. After the defeat of Hutelutush-Inshushinak in 1100 BC, the historical record of Elam is extremely scant for well over three centuries, a period often called the "Elamite Dark Ages". As a result, the political organization and administration of Elam in the early Neo-Elamite period is more or less completely unknown. Some form of Elamite royal authority appears to have been active from at least the late 9th century BC onwards, since Elamite troops were sent to support the Babylonian king Marduk-balassu-iqbi against the Assyrian king Shamshi-Adad V ( BC). An Elamite ambassador to Assyria is also attested in the reign of the Assyrian king Adad-nirari III ( BC).

First Neo-Elamite dynasty (c. 760–688 BC) 
Elam was clearly a consolidated kingdom with strong royal authority by the first half of the 8th century BC, when the country and its rulers once more begin to appear frequently in Mesopotamian texts. The earliest known dynasty of rulers from the Neo-Elamite period is conventionally referred to simply as the First Neo-Elamite dynasty.

Hubanid dynasty (688–645 BC) 
Though sometimes grouped together with the earlier Neo-Elamite kings in a single dynasty, there is no evidence for any kinship between Humban-menanu and Humban-haltash I and Babylonian sources appear to clearly distinguish the two as separate, suggesting that Humban-haltash I founded a new dynastic line. His dynasty is conventionally called the "Hubanid dynasty", after the common name element Humban (sometimes rendered Huban).

Late Elamite kings (c. 645–520/519 BC) 
Although Humban-haltash III is sometimes identified as the last king of Elam, material and documentation evidence suggests that some parts of Elam, including the region surrounding Susa, remained under the control of Elamite rulers until the time of the Achaemenid Empire. Most of these late rulers, with a few exceptions, had no known familial connections to each other. The sequence below follows the Elamite rulers of Susa and is tentative, with approximate regnal dates, due to the small number of surviving sources.

Elymais (c. 147 BC–AD 221/222) 

In the mid-2nd century BC, the kingdom of Elymais established control of large parts of ancient Elam, centered in the region of Khuzestan. Though in the past suggested to have been a Persian or Parthian realm, evidence such as the hostility between Elymais and Persian/Parthian rulers and the continued worship of otherwise non-Iranian (perhaps traditional Elamite) deities in the region suggests that the populace of Elymais were descendants of the old Elamites. The connection is further supported by the etymological connection between Elam and Elymais, Elymais probably simply being a Hellenized version of Elam, and that Akkadian-language sources from Babylonia refer to Elymais as "Elam" and its people as "Elamites".

Though the coins of Elymais were struck in Greek, it is possible that Greek was simply a monetary language and that the spoken language in Elam was still the ancient Elamite language. This is reinforced by several of the rulers bearing Elamite names, such as Kamnaskires, Pittit and Anzaze. The name Kamnaskires, borne by several kings, derives from the Elamite kapniškir, meaning "treasurer". Circumstancial evidence also supports the continuity of the Elamite language; in the Acts of the Apostles in the Bible, written in the late 1st century AD, Elamite is referenced as a distinct and living language and some evidence thereafter suggests it survived for far longer. In Arabic sources as late as the 10th century AD there are references to an "incomprehensible" language in Elam dubbed Khūzī, perhaps a late version of Elamite.

Because of the limited surviving source material, the names and dates of the kings of Elymais largely follows evidence from coinage, with some details also known from surviving Babylonian and Parthian documentation.

Kamnaskirid dynasty (c. 147 BC–AD 76)

Arsacid dynasty and late kings (c. 76–221/222) 

After the end of the Kamnaskirid dynasty in the late first century AD, around the year 76, Elymais was ruled by a cadet branch of the Arsacid dynasty, the ruling dynasty of the Parthian Empire. Coins minted by the Arsacid kings of Elymais are highly similar to the coins minted by the Kamnaskirid rulers, though differ in including inscriptions in both Greek and Aramaic, rather than just Greek.

See also 

 List of rulers of the pre-Achaemenid kingdoms of Iran
 List of monarchs of Persia
 List of Mesopotamian dynasties

Notes

References

Bibliography 

 
 
 
 

 
 
 
 
 
 
 
 
 
 
 
 
 

Elam
 
Iran history-related lists